Ida Grace Brooks Hunt (August 7, 1878 – December 6, 1929) was an American singer and actress.

Early life 
Ida Grace Brooks was born in Panama, the daughter of an American banker father and a musical mother from Barcelona. She attended a convent school there, and St. Francis Xavier school in Brooklyn. In 1908 she spent some time studying music in Paris, in the company of fellow American singer Oriska Worden.

Career 
Hunt was an actress with "an unusually high soprano" voice, who starred in the musicals Woodland (1904–1905) Algeria (1908), and The Chocolate Soldier (1909–1910). In 1906, she tossed the first pitch at a New York Giants baseball game. She had a musical act in vaudeville with Alfred de Manby.
During and after World War I, she entertained American troops in Europe, under the auspices of the YMCA. She spent months in French hospital recovering from health issues incurred during that work. Her last New York stage appearance was in Robin Hood, just a few weeks before she died in 1929.

Personal life 
In 1898, Ida Brooks married George Edwin Hunt, a dental surgeon. They lived in Indianapolis, and they divorced in 1906. He remarried in 1908. She died at her cousin's home in Brooklyn in 1929, after a stroke.

References

External links 

 A publicity photograph of Ida Brooks Hunt, probably from 1905, in the Philip Hale Photograph Collection, Boston Public Library.
 A publicity photograph of Ida Brooks Hunt, in the Billy Rose Theatre Collection Photograph File, New York Public Library Digital Collections.
 

1878 births
1929 deaths
American actresses
American women singers
American women in World War I
Vaudeville performers
20th-century American people